Ardozyga semiographa is a species of moth in the family Gelechiidae. It was described by Turner in 1919. It is found in Australia, where it has been recorded from Queensland.

The forewings are pale-fuscous with a few fuscous scales and a sharply defined blackish blotch in the disc at one-third, including the plical and first dorsal stigmata, its outline very irregular. The hindwings are pale-grey.

References

Ardozyga
Moths described in 1919
Moths of Australia